Para, or PARA, may refer to:

Businesses and organizations 
 Paramount Global, traded as PARA on the Nasdaq stock exchange
 Para Group, the former name of CT Corp
 Para Rubber, now Skellerup, a New Zealand manufacturer
 Para USA, formerly Para-Ordnance, a firearms manufacturer 
 Pan American Rugby Association
 Philippine Amateur Radio Association

People 
 Pará (footballer, born 1986), Marcos Rogério Ricci Lopes
 Pará (footballer, born 1987), Erinaldo Rabelo Santos
 Pará (footballer, born 1995), Anderson Ferreira da Silva
 Pará (footballer, born 2002), Luis Felipe Rabelo Costa
 André Cordeiro (water polo) (born 1967), nicknamed Pará, Brazilian water polo player
 Para Draine (born 1972), American female boxer

Places 
 Para (Bengali), a Bengali word meaning neighborhood or locality
 Pará, a state of Brazil
 Para (community development block), Purulia district, West Bengal, India
 Para, Purulia
 Para (Vidhan Sabha constituency)
 Para, Jhabua, Madhya Pradesh, India
 Para, Rajasthan, India
 Para, Unnao, Uttar Pradesh, India
 Para, Raebareli, Uttar Pradesh, India
 Para, Ivory Coast
 Para District, Suriname
 Para River (disambiguation)
 La Para, a summit in the Swiss Alps

Science and technology 
 Parity (biology), the number of times a woman has given birth, e.g. para 1 etc.
 Para, common name of fern Ptisana salicina
 para, symbol for the fruit fly gene paralytic (gene)
 Para- (chemistry), a position of a substituent on a cyclic hydrocarbon
 Para red, a dye

Other uses 
 Para (currency), a former currency of the Ottoman Empire
 Para language, an unclassified Naga language of India and Burma
 Para Handy, a fictional character in the Glasgow Evening News
 Para Loga, one among the seven Logas (upper worlds) in Ayyavazhi mythology
 Para Shakti, a Hindu goddess of the Shakti type sometimes concatenated Parashakti
 Brazilian ship Pará, a list of ships
 Juz', or para, a division of the Quran

See also 

 Paras (disambiguation)
 Param (disambiguation)
 List of commonly used taxonomic affixes
 Para Para, a popular Japanese solo dance
 Parachute Regiment (disambiguation)
 Paralympic Games, international games for athletes with a disability
 Paramilitary, organisations not part of the armed forces but operate as such
 Paraprofessional
 Paralegal
 Paramedic
 Parapsychology, the study of alleged psychic phenomena 
 Paratrooper, a military parachutist